Franklin Township is one of fifteen townships in Wayne County, Indiana, United States. As of the 2010 census, its population was 1,370 and it contained 534 housing units.

History
Franklin Township was organized in 1834.

Geography
The streams of Bethel Creek, Black Brook, Clay Run, Land Drain, Middle Brook, Small Run, Vernon Brook and White Creek run through this township.

The highest natural point in Indiana, Hoosier Hill, is located in this township.

Cities and towns
 Whitewater

Unincorporated towns
 Bethel at 
(This list is based on USGS data and may include former settlements.)

Cemeteries
The township contains the following cemeteries: Bethel, Mount Vernon, Whitewater and Woodbury.

Major highways
 Indiana State Road 227

References
 
 United States Census Bureau cartographic boundary files

External links
 Indiana Township Association
 United Township Association of Indiana

Townships in Wayne County, Indiana
Townships in Indiana